The Mindoro narrow-disked gecko (Gekko mindorensis) is a species of gecko. It is endemic to the Philippines.

References

Gekko
Reptiles of the Philippines
Endemic fauna of the Philippines
Reptiles described in 1919
Taxa named by Edward Harrison Taylor